The Anglican Diocese of Benin, an area within a province overseen by a bishop, is one of 12 within the Anglican Province of Bendel, itself one of 14 provinces within the Church of Nigeria the Anglican Communion's most populous province.

The current bishop is Peter Imasuen.

Notes

Dioceses of the Province of Bendel
 
Benin